Revenge of the Musketeers may refer to

 Revenge of the Musketeers (1994 film)
 Revenge of the Musketeers (1964 film)